John Colville JP (Glasgow 3 July 1852 – Motherwell 22 August 1901) was a Scottish businessman and Liberal politician.

Colville was born in Glasgow in 1852, and educated at Hamilton and Gartsherrie Academies. He was head of the firm of David Colville & Sons at Motherwell, iron and steel manufacturers.

He was elected Provost of Motherwell in 1888, a position he held until 1895, and served as Commissioner of Supply, a justice of the peace and a county councillor of Lanarkshire. He was also president of Lanarkshire Christian Union. In 1895 Colville was elected a Liberal Member of Parliament (MP) for North-East Lanarkshire. He was re-elected with a larger majority in 1900 and served until his death the following year aged 49.

Personal life
He married on August 31, 1885, Christina Marshall Downie, who was an active temperance worker.

His son John Colville was also a Member of Parliament, and Secretary of State for Scotland. He was created Baron Clydesmuir in 1948.

References

External links 
 

1852 births
1901 deaths
UK MPs 1895–1900
UK MPs 1900–1906
Scottish Liberal Party MPs
19th-century Scottish people
Politicians from Glasgow
John